"" (lit. "Hymn"), also known as "", is the national anthem of Iceland. Sveinbjörn Sveinbjörnsson composed the music, while the lyrics were authored by Matthías Jochumsson. It was adopted as the national anthem in 1944, when the country declared independence by voting to end its "personal union" and become a republic.

It is notorious for being extremely challenging to sing, and its strong religious theme has been the source of dispute in contemporary Iceland.

History

The late 19th century saw music in Iceland develop and flourish. Though many of their initial composers had to study and apply their trade abroad due to insufficient opportunities on offer at home, they were able to bring what they had learned back to Iceland. One of these musicians was Sveinbjörn Sveinbjörnsson, who was the first person from his homeland to pursue "an international career as a composer". He sojourned in Edinburgh during the early 1870s, and wrote the music for Lofsöngur inside a town house located in the city's New Town in 1874. By 1922, the song became so well known and loved throughout Iceland that, in recognition of this, the Althing endowed Sveinbjörnsson with a state pension. He was the first composer in the country to be conferred such an honour.

The lyrical portion of it was penned by Matthías Jochumsson, one of the "best loved poets" in the country who was also a priest. Although the commemorative plaque in Edinburgh purports that both the music and lyrics were written there, it is nowadays believed that Jochumsson had in fact produced the latter back in his homeland. Much like Sveinbjörnsson, Jochumsson became the first Icelandic poet to be given a state pension. The Althing also bestowed on him the title of "National Poet".

It was written to coincide with the 1874 festivities in honor of one millennium since the Norse first arrived on the island. It is for this reason that the full translation of the anthem's title is "The Millennial Hymn of Iceland". The song was first played on August 2 of that year, at a service celebrated at Reykjavík Cathedral to commemorate the milestone, with the King of Iceland, Christian IX, in attendance. However, the song was not officially adopted as the country's national anthem until 70 years later in 1944, when Icelanders voted in a referendum to end their state's personal union with Denmark and become a republic.

Lyrics
Although the Icelandic national anthem consists of three stanzas, only the first one is sung on a regular basis.

Criticism
The anthem is notorious for being extremely challenging to sing, due to its large vocal range of high and low registers—spanning a minor fourteenth. "Lofsöngur" has been described as a Christian hymn to God with strong religious themes. Thus, its suitability as the national anthem in Iceland's increasingly secular society of the present-day has been challenged, notwithstanding the fact that the country still maintains an official religion in the form of the Church of Iceland. Some have suggested replacing it with a non-religious song that is more all-encompassing.

Notes

References

External links 
 Upptökurnar eru af geisladisk sem forsætisráðuneytið gaf út árið 2003
 The Icelandic National Anthem
 Audio of the national anthem of Iceland, with information and lyrics (archive link)
 A simple but accurate MIDI transcription of the official version
 Video of choir singing 'Lofsöngur'

National symbols of Iceland
European anthems
Icelandic-language songs
Icelandic songs
National anthems
National anthem compositions in E major
1874 songs
Christian hymns